Wyrobki may refer to:

Wyrobki, Mogilno County
Wyrobki, Radziejów County